A pilot valve is a small valve that controls a limited-flow control feed to a separate piloted valve. Typically, this separate valve controls a high pressure or high flow feed. Pilot valves are useful because they allow a small and easily operated feed to control a much higher pressure or higher flow feed, which would otherwise require a much larger force to operate; indeed, this is even useful when a solenoid is used to operate the valve.

Pilot valves are often used in critical applications (e.g., emergency and SIS controls) and are human-operated. They can be set up as a push-to-activate or dead man's switch.

See also
 Larner–Johnson valve
 Pilot-operated relief valve
Valves